Jake Roxas (born July 13, 1977) is a Filipino actor. He is mostly known for his role in Imortal as Magnus Imperial. He was a contract actor of ABS-CBN.

Career
Roxas started his showbiz career in the GMA Network. He was a cast member of the teen-oriented show TGIS. He took a rest out of showbiz for six years. In 2010, he came back to showbiz signed with the ABS-CBN network.   He returned again to showbiz for FPJ's Ang Probinsyano in 2017.

Filmography

Television

Films
 TGIS (The Movie) (1997)
 Ikaw Na Sana (1998)
 Bulaklak ng Maynila (1999)
 Message Sent (2003)
 Xerex (2003)
 Walang Hanggang Paalam (2009)

Awards
 Winner, Best New Television Personality For Ikaw Na Sana (GMA 7), 1997 PMPC Star Awards For TV

References

External links

1977 births
Living people
Filipino male film actors
Place of birth missing (living people)

GMA Network personalities
ABS-CBN personalities
Star Magic